iland Internet Solutions provides hosted cloud infrastructure as a service for production business applications, disaster recovery and business continuity, testing and development, and software as a service enablement for independent software vendors. iland also provides traditional colocation and hybrid cloud services.
Founded in 1995, iland provides its services from high availability hubs specifically designed for cloud infrastructure in Boston, Washington D.C., Houston, Los Angeles, Dallas, Manchester, London, Amsterdam, Singapore, Melbourne, and Sydney. iland is a Premier-level partner in the VMware Service Provider Program (VSPP).

iland is a global cloud service provider of secure and compliant hosting for infrastructure (IaaS), disaster recovery (DRaaS), and backup as a service (BaaS). Headquartered in Houston, Texas and London, UK, iland delivers cloud services from its data centers throughout the Americas, Europe, Asia and Australia.

iland services 
iland provides cloud-based disaster recovery and business continuity services.
Other services include desktop virtualization integrated with a company's overall business continuity and disaster recovery plan, a cloud environment specifically for software as a service (SaaS) providers, and merged virtual cloud and physical colocation center servers for custom enterprise configurations.  It provides a data replication service for Dell EqualLogic customers.

References 

Companies based in Houston
Companies established in 1995
Cloud infrastructure
Cloud storage
Cloud computing providers
Business continuity
Remote desktop